Beverley McArthur (born 10 September 1949) is an Australian politician. She has been a Liberal Party member of the Victorian Legislative Council since 2018, representing Western Victoria Region.

Early life and education 
McArthur was born in Terang and raised on a rural property near Tylden, attending Tylden Primary School and Clyde School at Mount Macedon. She moved to London for five years after finishing high school, before returning to Australia and commencing a social science degree at the Bendigo College of Advanced Education. She was a staffer for federal MP Stewart McArthur following his 1983 election, and married McArthur in 1985. They later operated a beef farm near Camperdown for many years.

She joined the Liberal Party in her early twenties. She was the Bendigo federal electorate chairperson and was elected to the party's state administrative committee  1982. She unsuccessfully stood for the state presidency in 1992 after Michael Kroger's resignation, but was defeated by Ted Baillieu. She later served as a long-time country female state vice-president of the Liberal Party.

Parliamentary career 
Bev McArthur won Liberal preselection for the 2018 state election as a late replacement for Simon Ramsay, who abruptly retired due to drink-driving charges. She had previously been touted as a likely preselection candidate for the Australian Senate in 2019.

During her time in the Victorian Parliament, Bev McArthur has strongly advocated for increased hazard reduction burning on public land, in accordance with recommendations from the 2009 Victorian Bushfires Royal Commission. She is a proponent of the meat industry, fishing, hunting, duck shooting and horse racing.

In 2019, she warned against labelling climate change an 'emergency', likening the push to the boy who cried wolf and asking, "What happens when there is a genuine emergency like a terrorist attack, raging bush or urban fire, extreme weather events like cyclones and floods and power blackouts which threaten lives? Will anyone take notice of these emergencies?"

Bev McArthur has called for testing of the driving ability of foreign tourists, due to their involvement in 20% of crashes along the Great Ocean Road. In response, Premier Daniel Andrews labelled her comments "culturally inappropriate".

In 2021, she crossed the floor to vote against the Change or Suppression (Conversion) Practices Prohibition Bill 2020, which banned practices that intended to change individuals' sexual or gender identity. In her speech on the legislation, Mrs McArthur said:

This is not about electric shocks. This is about free individuals seeking advice on deeply personal matters that have irreversible and life-changing consequences. Individuals should be free to seek counselling, advice or care on any matter that they see fit without the interference of government.

References

1949 births
Living people
Liberal Party of Australia members of the Parliament of Victoria
Members of the Victorian Legislative Council
Women members of the Victorian Legislative Council
21st-century Australian politicians
21st-century Australian women politicians